Minkler may refer to:

 Minkler, California, a census-designated place in Fresno County, California, US
 Minkler, Washington, an unincorporated community in Skagit County, Washington, US
 Minkler (surname), including a list of people with the name